Copernicus may refer to the astronomer Nicolaus Copernicus (1473-1543).

Copernicus, Kopernik or Kopernikus may also refer to:

Science
 OAO-3 Copernicus, an orbiting astronomical observatory (X-ray and UV) launched on 21 August 1972
 Copernicus Programme, a joint initiative of the European Commission and European Space Agency
 Copernicus Science Centre, Warsaw, Poland
 Kopernik Observatory & Science Center, an observatory and science center in Vestal, New York
 Copernicium, element 112
 Copernicus (star), also known as 55 Cancri A in the 55 Cancri binary star system
 Copernicus Award, a Polish-German scientific award offered jointly by the Foundation for Polish Science and Deutsche Forschungsgemeinschaft
 Erdmann Copernicus (died 1573), German scholar, not related to the astronomer

Entertainment
 Copernicus (film), a 1973 Polish film
 Kopernikus, an 1979 opera by Canadian composer Claude Vivier
 Copernicus, a shuttlecraft in the Star Trek series
 Doctor Copernicus, a 1976 novel by John Banville
 Copernicus Publications, an academic publisher

Other uses
 Copernicus (lunar crater), a crater on the Moon
 Copernicus (Martian crater)
 Copernicus (yacht), a 1973 Polish yacht 
 Copernicus Cup, an annual indoor track and field competition 
 Copernicus Festival, a science festival held every May
 Copernicus Foundation, a non-profit organization in Chicago
 Copernicus Peak, the highest peak of Mount Hamilton, California
 Copernicus Airport Wrocław, Poland
 DFS Kopernikus, German TV satellites of the 1990s
 Index Copernicus, an online database of user-contributed information
 Kopernik (organization), a non-profit headquartered in Indonesia

See also
 Copernican (disambiguation)
 Copernicia, a genus of 24 species of palms
 Copernic Desktop Search, a desktop search engine
 Copernic, the company that produces Copernic Desktop Search